is a Japanese researcher in the field of robotics in Waseda University.　 He has developed the needle insertion system, robotic surgery, computer-assisted robot and tremor suppressibility robot.

Research Interests
Robotics
Robotic surgery
Surgical Segment Navigator
Medical, rehabilitation and assistive engineering
Computer-assisted surgery
Control engineering
Intelligent mechatronics

Education
Ph.D. degree in Engineering, 2008, Waseda University, Tokyo, Japan.

Employment
Visiting research assistant, Waseda university (2005-2007)
Fellow, Japan Society for the Promotion of Science (2007)
Assistant, Waseda university (2009-)
Instructor, Waseda university (2010-)

Membership
IEEE Robotics and Automation Society
The Japan Society of Mechanical Engineers

Honors and awards
Best paper award Finalist of 2008 IEEE Biomedical Robotics and Biomechatronics, 2008

References

External links 
:ja:早稲田大学の人物一覧
Masakatsu G. Fujie
:ja:菅野重樹
:ja:高西淳夫
早稲田大学総合理工学部 教員紹介

1981 births
Living people
Japanese roboticists
Academic staff of Waseda University